Demokrat Vladimirovich Leonov (April 1, 1926 – March 15, 1969) was a Soviet Border Troops colonel and a Hero of the Soviet Union, who was killed in action during the 1969 Sino-Soviet border conflict.

Biography
Leonov was born on April 1, 1926 in Baku. His father served as a Border Guard.

After finishing 9th grade of school in 1943, Leonov began serving as a member of the Soviet Border Troops, when Second World War was ongoing. He did not see any front line combat during the war. In 1947, he joined the Communist Party of Soviet Union and graduated from the Military Institute of the Ministry of Internal Affairs in 1954. Upon graduation, he was assigned to the South Caucasus region, and four years later he became chief of staff of the border detachment at the Transcaucasian Military District.

In 1968, Leonov was transferred to the city of Iman in Primorsky Krai, where he received the administrative position of chief of the 57th Border Detachment.

In March 1969, hostilities between China and Soviet Union erupted at the vicinity of Damansky Island on the Ussuri (Wusuli) River, near Manchuria. On March 15, Leonov led a group of three T-62 tanks of the 135th Motorized Rifle Division to provide support to an army unit against the People's Liberation Army units. However, his tank was disabled by PLA grenade launcher, injuring him. Leonov left his disabled tank, but was killed after he was shot directly in the heart by a Chinese sniper. The conflict ended on September 11, 1969, with a ceasefire and a return to the status quo.

Leonov was buried  with military honors at a memorial in the city of Iman (currently known as Dalnerechensk), where frontier-guards who died during the Sino-Soviet border conflict on Damansky Island are buried.

Awards and honors

Honorary State Security Officer

A street in Vladivostok is named after Leonov. A factory ship based at Petropavlovsk-Kamchatsky was also named in honor of him. A secondary school in the city of Magadan bore the name of Leonov, and a memorial plaque in honor of him was installed at a secondary school in the city of Arkhangelsk.

References 

1926 births
1969 deaths
Military personnel from Baku
Communist Party of the Soviet Union members
Soviet colonels
Soviet border guards
Soviet military personnel of World War II
Heroes of the Soviet Union
Recipients of the Order of Lenin
Soviet military personnel killed in action
Deaths by firearm in the Soviet Union
Recipients of the Medal "For Distinction in Guarding the State Border of the USSR"